Tansey Coetzee (born 8 October 1984) is a South African beauty pageant titleholder who won Miss South Africa 2007, and later represented South Africa in Miss Universe 2008 in Nha Trang, Vietnam, where she placed among the top 15 semifinalists. She is also the first coloured Miss South Africa winner in history to achieve high placements at both Miss World and Miss Universe. Only 4 Miss South Africa winners have ever achieved this.  She attended Allen Glen High School in Roodepoort, Johannesburg.

Information
She also represented her country in Miss World 2008 in her hometown, Johannesburg, South Africa, on 13 December 2008 where she placed among the top 5.

References

External links
 Miss South Africa 2007
Tansey Coetzee at IMDb

1984 births
Living people
Coloured South African people
South African people of Dutch descent
People from Johannesburg
Miss World 2008 delegates
Miss Universe 2008 contestants
South African female models
Miss South Africa winners